Benavente is a Spanish surname. Notable people with the surname include:

Diego Benavente (born 1959), Northern Mariana Islands politician
Cristian Benavente (born 1994), Peruvian-Spanish soccer player
Jacinto Benavente (1866–1954), Spanish dramatist
Saulo Benavente (1916–1982), Argentine painter

Spanish-language surnames